Misquamicut State Beach is a seaside public recreation area in the town of Westerly, Rhode Island. It occupies a portion of Misquamicut Beach, a  barrier island that extends westward from Weekapaug to Watch Hill and separates Winnapaug Pond from the Atlantic Ocean.

History
A series of hurricanes in 1938, 1944, and 1954 laid waste to the Misquamicut beach community, so Governor Dennis J. Roberts instigated condemnation proceedings that culminated in the creation of Misquamicut State Beach in 1959. The beach's 40-year-old septic system failed in 1992, at which time waterless composting toilets were introduced which allowed the park to stay in operation. A beach pavilion was added to the site in 1999 at a cost of $1.5 million, named for Westerly native State Senator James J. Federico, Jr. (1946-1997). The project was completed with the addition of a 2,700-space paved parking area in 2000. Hurricane Sandy blew much of the beach into the parking area in 2012; the state moved some 30,000 cubic yards of sand back onto the shoreline, and the U.S. Army Corps of Engineers completed the beach replenishment project in 2015, using an upland sand source.

Activities and amenities
The James J. Federico, Jr. State Beach Pavilion includes a bathhouse building with composting toilets, a concession building with gift shop and offices, a lifeguard tower, and shade gazebos. The Misquamicut Business Association sponsors various events throughout the year at the state beach and other locations. The beach is open seasonally.

References

External links

Misquamicut State Beach Rhode Island Department of Environmental Management Division of Parks & Recreation

State parks of Rhode Island
Westerly, Rhode Island
Beaches of Rhode Island
Beaches of Washington County, Rhode Island
Protected areas established in 1959
Protected areas of Washington County, Rhode Island
1959 establishments in Rhode Island